Kimihia Railway Station was on the North Island Main Trunk line, north of Huntly in the Waikato District of New Zealand.

One source said it was much nearer Huntly, where Kimihia Rd crossed the railway. Kimihia Rd level crossing was closed to traffic in 1945.

History 
The station opened when the Main Trunk was extended from Mercer to Ngāruawāhia, on 13 August 1877, built on part of Robert Reilly Ralph's (later owner of Ralph's coalmine)  farm.

Kimihia was usually not shown in timetables and was often one of the minor stations not served by passenger trains. An 1894 petition asked for Kimihia siding be converted into a flag station. In 1895 trains called at Kimihia Siding for school children and it became a flag station from 7 February 1896. By the end of that year it had a shelter shed, passenger platform and a passing loop for 37 wagons.

To ease congestion on the single track railway, a passing loop capable of holding 72 wagons was built in 1929. Work on doubling the track northwards started in 1937 and the station closed on 27 August 1939, when double track working started between Ohinewai and Huntly.

In 1944 Kimihia became part of Huntly Borough.

Kimihia colliery branch 

Powers to construct the mine branch were given in 1885. Initially it was a  branch around the southern shore of Lake Kimihia to the Taupiri Reserve Colliery Co. mine, which was opened on 1 August 1887 and named the Taupiri Branch. That mine closed due to a fire in 1910.

State Coal Mines started an opencast mine in 1943 to extract the coal left by the previous mine. It produced coal from 1944, when agreement was reached to use the Taupiri Coal Co's sidings, but the branch wasn't reopened until 1946. The opencast mine closed in 1977 and was replaced by Huntly East Mine in 1978.

From 7 July 1981 the Railway Corporation took over maintenance of the branch from the Mines Department. Until 2013 the mine was producing about 450,000 tonnes of coal a year, some 95% of it going by rail to Glenbrook steel mill. The mine closure was announced on 8 October and the branch closed on 21 October 2015. It was  when lifted in 2017.

References

External links 
1952 photo of branch at the mine
Video of the line in 2017

Railway stations in New Zealand
Buildings and structures in Waikato
Rail transport in Waikato
Railway stations opened in 1877
Railway stations closed in 1939
Huntly, New Zealand
1877 establishments in New Zealand